Domenick Davies (born 1 February 1978) is a German international rugby union player of Welsh descent, playing for the Bournemouth RFC in the National League 3 South and the German national rugby union team. His brother, Kieron Davies, is also a German international.

He has been playing rugby since 1985.

He was part of the German team against Luxembourg on 27 November 2004, scoring a try in a 96-0 victory, Germany's highest win ever at the time.

He sustained a cartilage injury in January 2010, ruling him out for the rest of the season and Germany's decisive ENC matches.

On 01 February 2023, Domenick became the Lord of Hougun Manor estate, Cumbria.

Stats
Domenick Davies's personal statistics in club and international rugby:

National team

European Nations Cup

- European Nations Cup Squad Member: 2000-2006 & 2008-2010.

- World Cup qualifier squad member: 2003 & 2007.

- 16 caps for the national team with test caps won against:

Denmark; 
Ukraine; 
Sweden; 
Russia; 
Holland; 
Latvia; 
Hong Kong; 
Poland;
Moldova; 
Croatia;
Luxembourg

- Friendly games played against:

British Army, Germany; 
Welsh Districts XV; 
Barbarians;
Gennevilliers (France Tour 2004)

- Other honours include:

-Dorset & Wiltshire U16-U21

-South West of England U19

-South England U19

-Welsh Exiles U19-U21

-Welsh U19 Squad Member

-Northern Germany Senior XV (Niedersachsen)

Friendlies & other competitions

 As of 23 March 2010

References

6. Concept2 tandem million meter world record https://www.concept2.com/indoor-rowers/racing/records/ultra-distance/world/million-meters

External links
 Domenick Davies at scrum.com
   Domenick Davies at totalrugby.de

1978 births
Living people
Welsh rugby union players
German rugby union players
Germany international rugby union players
Pontypridd RFC players
DRC Hannover players
DSV 78 Hannover players
Rugby union fullbacks
Welsh people of German descent